The Love Lottery is a 1954 British comedy film directed by Charles Crichton and starring David Niven, Peggy Cummins, Anne Vernon and Herbert Lom. Produced by Ealing Studios it was one of several Ealing Comedies that veered away from the standard formula. The film examines celebrity and fan worship with an international setting including Lake Como, ambitious dream sequences, and an uncredited cameo appearance at the end by Humphrey Bogart as himself.

It was shot in Technicolor. Interiors were shot at Ealing in West London with location shooting around Como in Italy standing in for the fictional town of Tremaggio. The film's sets were designed by the art director Thomas N. Morahan and the costumes by Anthony Mendleson. It was released by General Film Distributors as part of a long-standing agreement with Ealing.

Crichton said "it wasn't successful. I quite liked it. Perhaps it was too much a whimsy whamsy thing."

Plot
A celluloid heart-throb, who is haunted by dreams and hounded by fans, is manipulated by a gambling syndicate into being the prize in a lottery to find him a wife. But things get complicated when he falls in love before the lottery is drawn.

Cast

 David Niven as Rex Allerton 
 Peggy Cummins as Sally 
 Anne Vernon as Jane Dubois 
 Herbert Lom as André Amico 
 Charles Victor as Jennings 
 Gordon Jackson as Ralph 
 Felix Aylmer as Winant 
 Hugh McDermott as Rodney Wheeler 
 Stanley Maxted as Oliver Stanton 
 June Clyde as Viola 
 John Chandos as Gulliver Kee, Chinaman 
 Theodore Bikel as Parsimonious 
 Sebastian Cabot as Suarez 
 Eugene Deckers as Vernet
 Andreas Malandrinos as 	Fodor 
 Nicholas Stuart	as	American Radio Announcer
 Michael Ward as Hotel Receptionist
 Helena Pickard as Sally's Mother
 Marcel Poncin as Priest
 Alexis Chesnakov as 	The Russian Man
 Nelly Arno as the Russian woman
 Gabrielle Blunt as 	Doreen
 Mark Baker as 	Maxie
 John Glyn-Jones as Prince Boris
 Hattie Jacques as Chambermaid
 Michael Craig as Cameraman Assistant
 Alvar Liddell as Himself
 Humphrey Bogart as Himself

Release
The film was first shown at the Regent Theatre in Christchurch, New Zealand on 21 January 1954, as a royal performance during the New Zealand visit by Queen Elizabeth and the Duke of Edinburgh. The UK premiere was at the Gaumont Haymarket in London on 28 January 1954.

Critical reception
The reviewer for The Times expressed mixed views after the UK premiere: "The construction of The Love Lottery is deplorably weak ... and Mr. Charles Crichton, who directs the film for Ealing Studios, is left to make what he can of an idea which could branch out in a number of directions. ... Yet, even if catches are dropped, there is much in The Love Lottery which beguiles and entertains, The satire at the expense on film publicity methods and of the mentality of the film-fan is, in the Ealing tradition, so mild that a writer such as Mr. Clifford Odets would not recognize that it was there, but it is there, nevertheless, and it scores some palpable, if gentle, hits."

Michael Balcoln called it one of the worst movies made at Ealing. Many years later, the US edition of the TV Guide gave the film two out of four stars, calling it a "clever British satire on the Hollywood star system."

References

External links
 

1954 films
1954 comedy films
British comedy films
Ealing Studios films
Films directed by Charles Crichton
Films scored by Benjamin Frankel
Films set in Los Angeles
Films set in London
Films set in Italy
Films shot in Italy
Films about filmmaking
Films with screenplays by Harry Kurnitz
Films about lotteries
1950s English-language films
1950s British films